Crawcrook is a semi-rural village close to the western border of the metropolitan county of Tyne and Wear in England. Traditionally an independent village in County Durham, it was incorporated into the Metropolitan Borough of Gateshead on 1 April 1974. The population taken at the 2011 Census of the Gateshead ward (Crawcrook and Greenside) had increased to 8,841.

Location
Crawcrook lies in the Tyne Valley, midway between Prudhoe in Northumberland and Ryton, also in Tyne and Wear.

Local politics

In local government, Crawcrook is located in the 'Crawcrook, Greenside and Clara Vale ward'. The ward is at the far west of the borough and borders Northumberland. The Crawcrook and Greenside ward is served by three Labour councillors, Helen Haran, Kathleen McCartney and Hugh Kelly. 

Crawcrook is located within the parliamentary constituency of Blaydon. Its current MP is Labour's Liz Twist.

History

At the turn of the twentieth century, and in common with the nearby areas of Greenside, Clara Vale and Stargate, Crawcrook was a village with a vibrant coal industry. With major pits such as Emma and Clara, as well as several smaller pits, Crawcrook became a major coal mining centre. However the coal industry collapsed in the village during the 1950s and 1960s. As has happened to a number of other northern English villages employment in tertiary industries has replaced the coal industry. However, Crawcrook's coal mining heritage is still evident; a number of the old miners' homes still exist in the surrounding area, including Clifford Terrace and Morgy Hill near to Crawcrook's main street, and the Simpson Memorial Home in nearby Barmoor. Old wagonways used to transport coal are also still present, although they are now maintained as footpaths.

During the 1970s and 1980s, with the creation of the Kepier Chare and Westburn private housing estates, Crawcrook grew significantly in size and became largely suburbanised and is being used increasingly as a commuter village for the conurbation of Tyneside.

Significant expansion once again took place in the 2010s, with the construction of the Valley Rise estate in the north of the village, and the Fairfields Manor estate in the south. The latter attracted significant opposition due to its encroachment on the popular 'Hill 60' publicly accessible fields.

Amenities and transport links

Unlike many villages of a similar semi-rural character, Crawcrook has maintained its broad range of amenities. Crawcrook main street has several shops including a library, a co-operative food store and two petrol stations. It also has a selection of independent shops, including a family-run freezer centre/bargain store, which in October 2015 was renovated into a One Stop Store which is still family run, a greengrocers, a butchers, Three gentlemen's barbers, two hairdressing salons, a tanning salon, a number of pubs, a chiropodist, a doctor's surgery, which was rebuilt with a new pharmacy right next door, two veterinary practices and a restaurant. There are also several churches in the village from a number of denominations including Catholic, Pentecostal, Church of England and Methodist. After the closure of Kepier Chare school, the village now has only two primary schools; St Agnes Roman Catholic school and Emmaville school. During 2007, Emmaville school was extended to allow former pupils from Kepier Chare to attend there. In 2009 St Agnes Roman Catholic School relocated to the former Kepier Chare school. There is also a separate private nursery located next to the Doctor's Surgery.

The area is also well served by public transport, with regular bus links to Hexham, the MetroCentre, Gateshead and Newcastle Upon Tyne as well as nearby towns and villages such as Ryton, Prudhoe, Chopwell, High Spen and Clara Vale.

Crawcrook Sits less than 2 miles from the popular Hadrian's and Keelman's ways, providing traffic free cycling routes into Newcastle and Gateshead.

Crawcrook has its own village park, located in the Garden House Estate area of the village. Created in the 1950s it consists of toddler play equipment, a tennis court/five a side football area, and a bowling green.

The local football club, Ryton and Crawcrook Albion FC are based at Kingsley Park in the north of the village, and play in the Northern League, Division 2. 

Other recreational facilities nearby include four golf courses, Tyneside golf club at Ryton, Ryton golf club at Clara Vale, Close House golf club in Wylam, and Prudhoe golf club in Prudhoe. Golf courses slightly further away include Whickham golf club, at Whickham, Garesfield golf club at High Spen and Stocksfield golf club in Stocksfield.

Education

There are two primary schools in the village. St Agnes RC school, the school of Crawcrook's Roman Catholic parish, and Emmaville primary school. Both schools perform exceedingly well compared to other schools in the Gateshead Local Education Authority and nationally.

There was a third school, Kepier Chare school. However, in 2007 it was closed with some pupils transferred to Emmaville school or other local schools. In 2010 St Agnes RC school relocated to the former Kepier Chare and is to date still there, the existing St Agnes school building was demolished, with a small housing development taking its place.

Secondary education for the village is provided by Thorp Academy in Ryton, and St Thomas More Catholic School in Blaydon.

Surrounding area

Within less than a mile of Crawcrook's main street and its residential areas, lies farmland and rich countryside, particularly to the west and north of the village. To the west of the village these include farmland and Sled Lane, with its woodland and ponds; Bradley Gardens, a Victorian walled garden and, to the north, more farmland as well as the meadows between Crawcrook and Wylam.  

Other notable features of Crawcrook's environment include its landed estates, in particular Bradley Hall, and its sand quarries, that have partly encroached on some of its countryside to the north-west of the village. Further down the Tyne valley there are picturesque villages and towns such as Prudhoe, Stocksfield and Corbridge. 

There are quite a few churches in Crawcrook, one Methodist, one Anglican, and one Roman Catholic (St Agnes).

References

External links

 Census 2001 Summary of the Crawcrook and Greenside Ward. Provided by Gateshead Council.
 Methodist Churches in Crawcrook

Villages in Tyne and Wear
Ryton, Tyne and Wear